"Jackie" is a song written by Billy Steinberg and Tom Kelly for the 1987 film, Summer School. It was originally recorded by Elisa Fiorillo and included on the Summer School soundtrack. In 1988, "Jackie" was recorded by Lisa Stansfield's band, Blue Zone for their 1988 album, Big Thing. It was released as a single and peaked at number fifty-four on the US Billboard Hot 100 and number thirty-seven on the Hot Dance Club Songs. In 1998, "Jackie" was recorded by Joanne, who used samples from the Blue Zone version. It was issued as B.Z. featuring Joanne and reached number three in Australia and number five in New Zealand. Another cover by Redzone peaked at number thirty-seven in Australia.

Blue Zone version

"Jackie" was covered by Lisa Stansfield's band, Blue Zone for their 1988 album, Big Thing. It was produced by Paul Staveley O'Duffy and Ric Wake and released as a single around the world. In North America, the single was issued on July 26, 1988, and reached number fifty-four on the Billboard Hot 100 and number thirty-seven on the Hot Dance Club Songs. It was also released in Europe in September 1988, in Australia in December 1988 and in Japan in early 1989. Jackie" reached number nineteen in Sweden in February 1989. The single included two non-album tracks, "There Was I" and "Chance It," both written and produced by Blue Zone. In 2003, "There Was I" was featured on Stansfield's album, The Complete Collection. "Jackie" was remixed by Ric Wake (Wake Up Mix) and Paul Staveley O'Duffy (Shotgun Scream Mix). The music video was also released.

Track listings
7" single - UK, Europe, Australia
"Jackie" – 3:27
"There Was I" – 4:30

7" single - US, Canada
"Jackie" – 3:27
"Chance It" – 3:45

12" single - Europe
"Jackie" (Wake Up Mix) – 7:00
"Jackie" (Shotgun Scream Mix) – 5:00
"There Was I" – 4:30

12" single - US, Canada
"Jackie" (Extended Dance Mix) – 7:02
"Jackie" (Single Version) – 3:27
"Jackie" (Instrumental) – 6:54
"Chance It" – 3:45

5" CD single - Europe / 12" single - Australia
"Jackie" – 3:27
"Jackie" (Wake Up Mix) – 7:00
"Jackie" (Shotgun Scream Mix) – 5:00
"There Was I" – 4:30

3" mini CD single - Europe
"Jackie" – 3:27
"Jackie" (Wake Up Mix) – 7:00
"There Was I" – 4:30
"Chance It" – 3:45

Charts

Joanne version

In 1998, Australian singer Joanne recorded "Jackie" using samples from the Blue Zone version. It was released as a single and was credited to 'B.Z. featuring Joanne'. The song peaked at number three in Australia and number five in New Zealand. "Jackie" won an ARIA Music Award for the Highest Selling Single in 1999. Two years later, the 2001 remix of the song was included on Joanne's debut album, Do Not Disturb.

Track listings
Australian CD single
"Jackie" (Radio Edit) – 4:05
"Jackie" (Extended Version) – 5:22
"Jackie" (XL Club Mix) – 8:18
"All of Me" (Radio Edit) by XL Connection – 4:18
"All of Me" (Extended Mix) by XL Connection – 7:52
"All of Me" (XL Race You to the Sun Mix) by XL Connection – 9:23

Charts

Weekly charts

Year-end charts

Certifications

Redzone version

"Jackie" was also covered by the Australian band, Redzone and released as a single in September 1998, simultaneously with the Joanne version. It peaked at number thirty-seven in Australia.

Track listings
Australian CD single
"Jackie" (Day Radio Edit) – 3:19
"Jackie" (Night Radio Edit) – 3:35
"Jackie" (Smash 'N' Grab's 'Lemon Jumper' Radio Edit) – 3:52
"Jackie" (12" Mix) – 6:58
"Jackie" (Smash 'N' Grab's 'Lemon Jumper' Club Mix) – 6:39
"O-Positive" – 4:01

Charts

References

1987 songs
1988 singles
1998 singles
Blue Zone (band) songs
Joanne Accom songs
Songs written by Billy Steinberg
Songs written by Tom Kelly (musician)
ARIA Award-winning songs
Arista Records singles